New Gibraltar Democracy (NGD) was a conservative and Christian-democratic political party in Gibraltar founded in 2005 by Gibraltarian barrister Charles Gomez. The party's aim was "to create a new vision for politics in Gibraltar"

In the 2007 General Election, NGD Leader Charles Gomez polled 1,210 votes in an electorate of just over 14,000. Making it the best performance for a first time independent candidate in Gibraltar's history.

Election results

Parliament of Gibraltar

References

Defunct political parties in Gibraltar
Political parties established in 2005
2005 establishments in Gibraltar
Defunct Christian political parties
Christian democratic parties in Europe